Carlos Antonio López Ynsfrán (November 4, 1792 – September 10, 1862) served as leader of Paraguay from 1841 to 1862.

Early life
López was born at Manorá (Asunción) on November 4, 1792, as one of eight children. He graduated from Real Colegio y Seminario de San Carlos and then began a law practice, a profession which allowed him to develop influential connections. He attracted the hostility of the dictator José Gaspar Rodríguez de Francia, his reputed uncle, which caused him to go into hiding for several years.

Political career

López served briefly as secretary of the military junta led by Colonel Mariano Roque Alonso that ruled the country from 1840 to 1841, after the death of Francia.  On March 12, 1841, Congress chose López and Alonso to be joint consuls for three years. In 1844, he exiled Roque and assumed dictatorial powers. A few months later, Congress adopted a new constitution, which changed the head of state's title from consul to president and elected López to the new post for a 10-year term. The constitution vested López with powers almost as sweeping as those "El Supremo" had held for most of his 26-year rule, effectively codifying the dictatorial powers he had seized just months earlier. The document included no guarantees of civil rights; indeed, the word "liberty" was not even mentioned in the text.

He was re-elected for a three-year term in 1854 and again in 1857 for ten more years, with the power to nominate his own successor.

His government was directed towards developing Paraguay's primary resource extraction and strengthening Paraguay's armed forces. He contracted numerous foreign technicians, most of which were English, and built up the formidable Fortress of Humaitá.

Prior to the constitution adopted in 1844 that legitimized López’s presidency, Paraguay had no official document of sovereignty; López’s influence led to the recognition of Paraguay as an independent nation. However, his approach to foreign affairs several times involved him in diplomatic disputes with the Empire of Brazil, the United States, and the British Empire, which nearly resulted in war. His government was somewhat more tolerant of opposition than Francia's had been. He released all political prisoners soon after he took full power and also took measures to abolish slavery.

During López’s presidency, Paraguay’s economy saw unprecedented growth. He signed commercial treaties with Brazil in 1850; Great Britain, France, and the United States in 1853; and Argentina in 1856. His government worked to improve infrastructure and transportation within the country through the establishment of a new railroad line and steamship river routes. López also encouraged public education through the expansion of primary schools and the reopening of the seminary he attended as a young man, which increased literacy throughout the country.

His eldest son, Francisco Solano López (1827–1870), succeeded him as president after his death. A barrio of Asuncion is named after him.

Sources on his life are scarce. For a brief modern biography see Bealer, Lewis W. "Carlos Antonio Lopez, Organizer and Dictator of the Paraguayan Republic" (Chapter Eleven, pages 136-153) in South American Dictators During the First Century of Independence, edited by A. Curtis Wilgus (George Washington University Press, 1937; reissued by Russell & Russell Inc., 1963). Bealer cites Captain Richard F. Burton's Letters from the Battlefields of Paraguay (London, 1870) as his primary source of factual information, though for those who read Spanish, he cites in the positive Andres Gelly's El Paraguay (Paris, 1926), who was Lopez's minister at Rio de Janeiro, as a good source for information "on developments to 1848". Bealer claims Washburn's History of Paraguay (2 vols., Boston, 1871) is "woefully unreliable and biased except where direct quotation is made".

See also
 History of Paraguay
 List of presidents of Paraguay

References

Sources

Plá, Josefina (1976). The British in Paraguay 1850–1870. The Richmond Publishing Co in association with St Antony's College, Oxford.
Williams, John Hoyt (1977). "Foreign Tecnicos and the Modernization of Paraguay". Journal of Interamerican Studies and World Affairs (Center for Latin American Studies at the University of Miam): pp. 233–257.  

1792 births
1862 deaths
People from Asunción
Presidents of Paraguay
19th-century Paraguayan people